Sucarnoochee is an unincorporated community in Kemper County, Mississippi, United States. Its post office  has been closed. It was also known as Sucarnooche.

The community was named from its location near the Sucarnoochee River.

Sucarnoochee is located on the Kansas City Southern Railway. In 1900, Sucarnoochee's population was 92.

References

Unincorporated communities in Kemper County, Mississippi
Unincorporated communities in Mississippi
Mississippi placenames of Native American origin